Gianluca Galimberti (born 30 May 1968 in Cremona) is an Italian professor and politician.

He is a member of the Democratic Party and he was elected Mayor of Cremona on 8 June 2014 and took office on 10 June. He has been re-elected for a second term in 2019.

See also
2014 Italian local elections
2019 Italian local elections
List of mayors of Cremona

References

External links
 
 

1968 births
Living people
Mayors of Cremona
Democratic Party (Italy) politicians